D.A.V. Public School is a school in Pushpanjali Enclave, New Delhi, India. The school was founded in 1989, in a kothi (bungalow) with only 400 students and 20 teachers. Gradually, the school started to develop and it now has a building with another kindergarten branch. The school teaches students from Lower Kindergarten (L.K.G.) to Class XII.

The school has approximately 4000 students with 200 staff members under the guidance of principal, Mrs. Rashmi Raj Biswal. The school covers an area of 4 acres, with a separate kindergarten wing. The school celebrated its 25th anniversary on 23 January 2014. The school is affiliated to the Central Board of Secondary Education (CBSE).

Infrastructure
The school has separate laborator for physics, chemistry, biology, home science, computer, Global hub, mathematics, integrated science, and robotics. It has an auditorium, a sports room, dance room, conference hall, basketball court, skating area, stage, music room, art room, sculpture room, two separate senior and junior libraries, medical room with a doctor and nurse. The school also has a resource room for teachers, a herbal park, a science park (tribute to A.P.J. Abdul Kalam), a canteen, yoga room and a ground serving as a play area. The school also provides bus transportation. The school has a solar power system. Training is given in sports like cricket, basketball, badminton, kho-kho, Judo, yoga, volleyball, and chess. All the classes have smart electric boards. The school was awarded British Council award.

See also
Education in India
Education in Delhi
List of schools in Delhi
CBSE

References

 

Schools in Delhi